Yantarni Volcano is an andesitic stratovolcano in the U.S. state of Alaska. It is on the Alaska Peninsula, in the Aleutian Range, between Mount Aniakchak and Mount Chiginagak volcanoes. The volcano was not discovered until 1979 due to its remote location, lack of documented historic activity, and its rather modest summit elevation. The mountain was named after nearby Yantarni Bay, which in turn was named by Russian explorers after the abundance of yantar in the area.

Geology
The current cycle of eruptive activity began in middle Pleistocene time with extrusion of andesitic lava flows, perhaps from multiple vents. By the late Pleistocene, central-vent volcanism had initiated construction of a small stratovolcano.

800 BCE ± 500 years eruption
The cone was breached sometime in the late Holocene, between 2 and 3.5 ka, during the only Holocene event.
The eruption was similar to that of  Mount St. Helens. and was followed by the emplacement of 1 cu km of pyroclastic flows related to growth of the summit lava dome. It had a Volcanic Explosivity Index of 5

Notes

Sources
 Volcanoes of the Alaska Peninsula and Aleutian Islands-Selected Photographs

Volcanoes of Lake and Peninsula Borough, Alaska
Mountains of Lake and Peninsula Borough, Alaska
Stratovolcanoes of the United States
Mountains of Alaska
Volcanoes of Alaska
VEI-5 volcanoes
Aleutian Range
Pleistocene stratovolcanoes
Holocene stratovolcanoes